Bean or Beans is a given name, English surname and nickname.

People with surname Bean

Actors 
 Sean Bean, English actor
 Orson Bean (1928–2020), American actor
 Shoshana Bean, American stage actress, singer and songwriter

Athletes 
 Andy Bean, American golfer
 Billy Bean, American baseball player
 Colter Bean, American baseball player
 George Bean (cricketer), English cricketer
 Jake Bean, Canadian hockey player
 Justin Bean (born 1996), American basketball player
 Joe Bean, American baseball player
 Marcus Bean, English footballer
 Scott Bean (born 1976), Zimbabwean cricketer

Politicians 
 James Bean (1933–2013), American politician
 Joshua Bean, American politician
 Melissa Bean, American politician
 John Bean (politician), British far-right wing figure

Scientists 
 Alan Bean (1932–2018), NASA astronaut from the Apollo era
 Barton Appler Bean (1860–1947), American ichthyologist, brother of Tarleton Hoffman Bean
 Charles Bean, Australian historian
 Charlie Bean, British economist
 Tarleton Hoffman Bean (1846–1916), American ichthyologist, brother of Barton Appler Bean
 William Bennett Bean, American medical historian and teacher
 William Jackson Bean, botanist

Other people
 Anne Bean, British installation and performance artist
 Bennett Bean, American ceramics artist
 Hugh Bean (1929–2003), English violinist
 Joel Bean, American Quaker
 John Bean (cinematographer) (1963–2011), Australian cinematographer
 John William Bean (1824–1882), British criminal who attempted to assassinate Queen Victoria
 Laura Schiff Bean, American artist
 Louis H. Bean (1896–1994), American economic and political analyst
 Maurice Darrow Bean
 Mollie Bean, soldier for the Confederate Army
 Roy Bean, Wild West figure
 Sawney Bean, notorious clan leader of 16th century Scotland
 Terry "Harmonica" Bean (born 1961), American blues harmonicist, guitarist and songwriter.

People nicknamed Bean or Beans
 Coleman Hawkins, American jazz saxophonist, known as "Bean"
 Beans Reardon, American baseball umpire 
 Gene "Bean" Baxter, radio host of the Kevin and Bean show

Fictional characters
 Mr. Bean (character), a bumbling character played by Rowan Atkinson in the British comedy television programme Mr. Bean and two films
 Bean (film), a feature film based on the above program
 Bean (Enderverse), a character in the Ender's Game series of books
 Bean the Dynamite, from Sonic the Hedgehog
 Hannibal Roy Bean, from Xiaolin Showdown
 Bean played by Alan Arkin in the 1974 film, Freebie and The Bean
 Beans (Looney Tunes), a black and white Looney Tunes character
 the title character of Baron Bean, a syndicated newspaper comic strip
 Benjamin "Beans" Baxter, in the American television series The New Adventures of Beans Baxter
 Bernard "Beans" Aranguren, a recurring character in the American television series Even Stevens
 Bean Bradley, in the video game MySims
 Bean, the main character in the animated series Disenchantment
 Jack "Killer" Bean, the protagonist of Killer Bean Forever, voiced by Vegas J. Jenkins (2009 movie) and Jeff Lew (2020 series)
 Bean, in the children's book series Ivy and Bean
 Clarice Bean, in the Clarice Bean series of children's books
 Franklin Bean, main antagonist of Fantastic Mr. Fox
 Beans, in the horror video game Baldi's Basics

See also
 Justice Bean (disambiguation)
 Beane (surname)

English-language surnames